NPO Zappelin  is a Dutch television program block for younger children that launched as Z@ppelin in September 2000. Before Z@ppelin, the programmes were scheduled on all three public channels (Nederland 1, Nederland 2 and Nederland 3). On 4 September 2005, Z@ppelin became a channel for children aged 2–6 years. The @ in the name of the channel was dropped on 10 September 2012. On 12 March 2013, the NPO announced that Zapp and Zappelin would be renamed as NPO Zapp and NPO Zappelin. The reason for this change is to make the channels and its programmes more recognisable. The rebranding completed on 19 August 2014. Together with NPO Zapp it broadcasts on NPO 3 during daytime. It is also part of the 24-hour children's channel NPO Zappelin Xtra.

Current and Former programming

Heidi
Maya the Bee
Mega Mindy
Mega Toby
Miffy and Friends
Moomin
Nils Holgersson
Ox Tales
Sesamstraat
10 Voor...Vicky the VikingForeign series64 Zoo Lane (UK)Angelina Ballerina: The Next Steps (UK)Babar and the Adventures of Badou (Canada)Barbapapa (France)Bernard (France)Big & Small (UK)Bob the Builder (UK)Calimero (Italy)Gaspard and Lisa (France)Grizzy and the Lemmings (France)Guess How Much I Love You (UK)Hey Duggee (UK)Lassie (US)Masha and the Bear (Russia)Igam Ogam (UK)Joe and Jack (Ireland)Mike the Knight (UK)Nelly and Ceaser (France)Noddy (UK)Olivia (US)Olly the Little White Van (UK)Pat & Mat (Czech Republic)Peppa Pig (UK)Peter Rabbit (UK)Pim & Pom (Italy)Pingu (Switzerland)Pippi Longstocking (Sweden)Q Pootle 5 (UK)Sarah and Duck (UK)Shaun the Sheep (UK)Simon (France)Wallace and Gromit (UK)Wibbly Pig'' (UK)

See also
Television in the Netherlands

References

External links
 www.zappelin.nl

2000 establishments in the Netherlands
Television channels in the Netherlands
Television channels and stations established in 2000
Netherlands Public Broadcasting